Sohrab (also Romanized as Sohrāb; also known as Sārā, Sārāb, Sārāb Sohrāb, Zadeh, and Zara‘) is a village in Estabraq Rural District, in the Central District of Shahr-e Babak County, Kerman Province, Iran. At the 2006 census, its population was 515, in 121 families.

References 

Populated places in Shahr-e Babak County